The 2016 United States House of Representatives election in Montana was held on November 8, 2016, to elect the U.S. representative from Montana's at-large congressional district. The election coincided with the 2016 U.S. presidential election, as well as other elections to the House of Representatives, elections to the United States Senate and various state and local elections.

At the time, Montana's congressional district had a PVI of R+7. Republican Ryan Zinke, who was first elected in 2014, is the incumbent. Zinke was re-elected in 2016. He faced no primary opposition. Denise Juneau, who is the Montana State Superintendent of Public Instruction, was the lone Democrat to file for election. The primaries were held on June 7.

Republican primary

Candidates
 Ryan Zinke, incumbent

Results

Democratic primary

Candidates
 Denise Juneau, State Superintendent of Public Instruction

Results

General election

Polling

Results

References

External links
U.S. House election in Montana, 2016 at Ballotpedia
Campaign contributions at OpenSecrets

House
Montana
2016